Epermenia dalianicola is a moth in the family Epermeniidae. It was described by Reinhard Gaedike in 2007. The species is found in Liaoning, China.

References

Moths described in 2007
Epermeniidae
Moths of Asia